Salinas is a surname that originated in Spain. Notable people with the surname include:

General 

Ana Reeves Salinas (born 1948), Chilean television, film and theatre actress
Angela Salinas (born 1953), U.S. Marine Corps general
Alfonso Jose Sol Salinas Muzquiz, (born 1968), Civil engineer.
Antonio Salinas, Mexican dancer and actor
Claudia Salinas (born 1983), Mexican model and actress
Domingo de Salinas (1547–1600), Spanish Roman Catholic prelate
Efrain Salinas y Velasco (1886–1968), Bishop of Mexico
Elma Salinas Ender (born 1953), U.S. lawyer and judge
Emiliano Salinas (born 1976), Mexican businessman, son of Carlos Salinas de Gortari
Ezequiel D. Salinas (1908–2007), Mexican-American judge
Francisco de Salinas, 16th-century Spanish music theorist
Froy Salinas (1939-2021), American politician
Gustavo Salinas Carmiña (1893–1964), mexican aviation pioneer
H. Scott Salinas, U.S. composer and musician
Horacio Salinas (born 1951), Chilean guitarist and composer
Hugo Salinas Price (born 1932), Mexican businessman, founder of Grupo Elektra
Irvin "Pee Wee" Salinas (born 1988), Mexican-American singer and actor
Jason Salinas (born 1984), U.S. handcrafted eyewear designer 
Joel Salinas (born 1983), U.S.medical researcher
Jone Salinas (1918–1992), Italian actress
Jorge Salinas (born 1968), Mexican actor
Joy Salinas, Filipino singer
Juan Pablo Salinas y Teruel (1871 – 1946), Spanish painter
Luis Salinas, Argentinian jazz guitarist
Luis Omar Salinas (1937–2008), U.S. Chicano poet
María Elena Salinas, U.S. journalist and author
María de Salinas (ca. 1490-1539), Spanish noblewoman and lady-in-waiting to Catherine of Aragón
Moisés Salinas (born 1966), Mexican scholar and activist
Nora Salinas (born 1976), Mexican actress
Pedro Salinas (1891–1951), Spanish writer
Porfirio Salinas (1910–1973), Mexican-American painter
Raúl Salinas de Gortari (born 1946), Mexican businessman and convicted felon, brother of Carlos Salinas de Gortari
Ric Salinas (born 1960), Salvadoran American actor, writer and producer
Ricardo Salinas Pliego (born 1955), Mexican businessman, son of Hugo Salinas Price, founder of Grupo Salina

Politics 

Alberto Salinas Carranza (1892–1970), Mexican aviator and politician
Andrea Salinas (born 1970), U.S. politician
Antonio Salinas y Castañeda (1810–1874), Peruvian politician and Mayor of Lima
Carlos Salinas de Gortari (born 1948), Mexican president
Carmen Salinas (born 1939), Mexican actress and politician
Carmen Salinas de la Vega (1807-?), Ecuadorian aristocrat and First Lady
Constantino Salinas (1886–1966), Spanish physician and politician
Diego de Salinas (1649–1720), last Spanish Governor of Gibraltar
Emilio Salinas (1864–1927), Mexican military man and politician
Francisco Vidal Salinas, Chilean politician
Glafiro Salinas Mendiola (born 1946), Mexican politician
Gregorio de Salinas Varona (1647 or 1650 –1720), Spanish administrator, Governor of Texas, Nuevo León, Honduras, Coahuila
Jaime Salinas (born 1963), Peruvian politician
Javier Salinas Narváez (born 1965), Mexican politician
José Arturo Salinas Garza (born 1975), Mexican politician
José Miguel Insulza Salinas, Chilean politician
Josefina Salinas Pérez (born 1965), Mexican politician
Juan de Salinas, 17th Century governor of Spanish Florida
Juan de Salinas y Zenitagoya (1755– 1810), Spanish colonial officer from Ecuador
Maria Isabel Salinas (born 1966), Spanish politician
Raul G. Salinas (born 1947), U.S. businessman and former mayor of Laredo, Texas.
Raúl Salinas Lozano (1917-2004), Mexican economist and politician, father of Carlos Salinas de Gortari
Simon Salinas (born 1956), U.S. politician from California
Alfonso Sol Salinas Muzquiz (1968)

Sports 

Andrés Salinas (born 1986), Colombian footballer
Carlos Salinas (footballer) (born 1938), Peruvian footballer
César Salinas (1961–2020), Bolivian football administrator
Claudio Salinas (born 1976), Chilean footballer
Dennis Salinas (born 1986), Salvadoran footballer
Felipe Salinas (born 1982), Chilean footballer
Félix Salinas (born 1939), Peruvian footballer
Guillermo Salinas (born 1938), Chilean boxer
Gustavo Salinas, Mexican sports shooter
Hans Salinas (born 1990), Chilean footballer
Jorge Salinas (footballer) (born 1992), Paraguayan footballer
Julio Salinas (born 1962), Spanish footballer
Leonardo Salinas (born 1980), Mexican swimmer
Lucas Salinas, (born 1995), Brazilian footballer
Néstor Salinas (born 1993), Spanish footballer
Óscar Salinas (born 1988), Chilean footballer
Pablo Salinas, Bolivian footballer
Patxi Salinas (born 1963), Spanish footballer
Raúl Alberto Salinas (born 1978), also known as La Bala Salinas, Mexican footballer
Richard Adrián Salinas (born 1988), Paraguayan footballer
Rodolfo Salinas (born 1987), Mexican footballer
Rodrigo Salinas (footballer, born 1986), Argentine footballer
Rodrigo Salinas (footballer, born 1988), Mexican footballer
Rodrigo Salinas Muñoz (born 1989), Chilean handball player
Rolando Salinas (1889–?), Chilean racewalker
Shea Salinas (born 1986), U.S. football (soccer) player
 Salinas, the ring name of Shelly Martinez in TNA Wrestling
Valeria Salinas González (born 2000), Mexican female volleyball player
Yoandris Salinas (born 1985), Cuban professional boxer
Yonathan Salinas (born 1990), Venezuelan cyclist
Yostin Salinas (born 1998), Costa-Rican footballer

Spanish-language surnames